William (Billy) Ray Brown (born April 5, 1963) is a former American professional golfer who played on the PGA Tour in the 1980s and 1990s, and a current on course reporter for Golf Channel and commentator for CBS Sports.

Brown was born, raised, and makes his home in Missouri City, Texas. His father, Charlie Brown, played football for the Houston Cougars football and professionally in the CFL and AFL. Billy Ray attended the University of Houston and was a member of the Cougar golf team. He won the 1982 NCAA Division I Championship as a freshman. He was also a member of the 1984 and 1985 national championship teams, and was an All-American all four years.

Brown won three PGA Tour events in a career cut short by an injury and subsequent surgeries to his wrist. His best finish in a major championship was T-3 at the 1990 U.S. Open, one stroke out of the playoff. He had 17 top-10 finishes in 315 PGA Tour events.

After his playing days ended, Brown moved into the media to serve as an on-course reporter for ABC Sports from 1999 until 2006.  In 2007, Brown joined the Golf Channel as an on-course reporter for their PGA Tour and Champions Tour coverage.

Amateur wins (1)
this list may be incomplete
1982 NCAA Championship

Professional wins (3)

PGA Tour wins (3)

*Note: The 1992 GTE Byron Nelson Golf Classic was shortened to 54 holes due to rain.

PGA Tour playoff record (2–0)

Results in major championships

CUT = missed the half-way cut
"T" = tied

See also
1987 PGA Tour Qualifying School graduates
1995 PGA Tour Qualifying School graduates
1996 PGA Tour Qualifying School graduates

References

External links

American male golfers
Houston Cougars men's golfers
PGA Tour golfers
Golf writers and broadcasters
Golfers from Texas
People from Missouri City, Texas
Sportspeople from Harris County, Texas
1963 births
Living people